Nycteola degenerana, the sallow nycteoline, is a moth of the family Nolidae. The species was first described by Jacob Hübner in 1799. It is found in Europe, from southern Fennoscandia to Spain, Italy and the Balkans. Outside of Europe it is found in China, Japan, the Korean Peninsula, the Russian Far East (Primorye, southern Khabarovsk and the southern Amur region), southern Siberia (Transbaikalia, the Baikal area, Altai and western Siberia), Turkey and the Ural.

The wingspan is 23–28 mm. It is the largest species of the genus. The palps are usually pure white. The  ground colour of the forewings is greenish white to off-white with distinct black double lines shades and wavy black lines and spots in the basal area. The front half of the discal area with reddish-brown intermingling. Certain determination only by genitalic examination.

Adults are on wing from mid-June to the beginning of July and from the end of July (after overwintering) to May. There are two generations per year.

The larvae feed on Salix (including S. caprea, S. aurita, S. cinerea, S. myrsinifolia and S. phylicifolia) and Quercus robur.

External links

Korean Insects
Swedish Moths
Lepiforum e.V.

Chloephorinae
Moths of Japan
Moths of Europe
Taxa named by Jacob Hübner
Moths described in 1799